Iain Reid (born 1981) is a Canadian writer. Winner of the RBC Taylor Emerging Writer Award in 2015, Reid is the author of I'm Thinking of Ending Things (2016) and Foe (2018).

Writing career
Reid established his writing career by publishing articles and columns in national magazines and newspapers after graduating from Queen's University in Kingston, Ontario. He drew the National Post attention, garnering a weekly column assignment. In 2015, his work began appearing in The New Yorker.

Reid's first memoir, One Bird's Choice: A Year in the Life of an Over-educated, Underemployed Twentysomething Who Moves Back Home, was published in 2010, and was followed by The Truth About Luck: What I Learned on my Road Trip with Grandma in 2013. His debut novel, I'm Thinking of Ending Things, was published in 2016. Charlie Kaufman adapted it into a film for Netflix in 2020.

Reid's second novel, Foe, was published by Simon and Schuster in 2018. Anonymous Content purchased the book's film rights, and filming is set to begin in Australia in January 2022.

Reid's third novel, We Spread, was published by Scout Press in September 2022.

Personal life
Reid lives in Kingston, Ontario. , his sister Eliza Reid is the First Lady of Iceland and his brother-in-law is Guðni Th. Jóhannesson, the President of Iceland.

Bibliography

Non-fiction
One Bird's Choice: A Year in the Life of an Over-educated, Underemployed Twentysomething Who Moves Back Home (2010, House of Anansi Press)
The Truth About Luck: What I Learned on my Road Trip with Grandma (2013, House of Anansi Press)

Fiction
I'm Thinking of Ending Things (2016, Scout Press/Simon & Schuster)
Foe (2018, Scout Press/Simon & Schuster)
We Spread (2022, Scout Press/Simon & Schuster)

References

1981 births
21st-century Canadian novelists
Canadian male novelists
Canadian memoirists
Writers from Kingston, Ontario
Living people
21st-century Canadian male writers
Canadian male non-fiction writers
21st-century Canadian non-fiction writers
21st-century memoirists